Hendrik Theodor Smit Buhrmann (born 7 July 1963) is a South African professional golfer.

Buhrmann was born in Vereeniging. He turned professional in 1985 and has won eight tournaments on the Southern African Sunshine Tour. Since 1995 he has also been a member of the Asian Tour and in 2006, after a string four second-place finishes stretching back a decade, he won for the first time on that tour at the Aamby Valley Asian Masters.

Professional wins (9)

Asian Tour wins (1)

Sunshine Tour wins (8)
1991 Mercedes Benz Golf Challenge
1991 Eastern Cape Classic, Lombard Tyres TVL Classic
1993 Nashua Wild Coast Sun Challenge
1994 Nashua Wild Coast Sun Challenge
2002 FNB Botswana Open
2003 Devonvale Championship
2005 Capital Alliance Royal Swazi Sun Open

Results in major championships

Note: Buhrmann only played in The Open Championship.
"T" = tied

Team appearances
World Cup (representing South Africa): 1995
Alfred Dunhill Challenge (representing Southern Africa): 1995 (winners)

References

External links

South African male golfers
Sunshine Tour golfers
Asian Tour golfers
Golfers from Johannesburg
People from Vereeniging
Sportspeople from Gauteng
White South African people
1963 births
Living people